Dwight Eversley Yorke CM (born 3 November 1971) is a Trinidadian and Tobagonian professional football coach and former player who was most recently in charge of Australian A-League club Macarthur FC. 

Throughout his club career, he played for Aston Villa, Manchester United, Blackburn Rovers, Birmingham City, Sydney FC and Sunderland, mainly as a forward, between 1988 and 2009. 

He was the assistant manager of the Trinidad and Tobago national team until the completion of the qualifying matches for the 2010 FIFA World Cup. Yorke scored 123 goals in the Premier League, a record for a non-European which was not broken until Sergio Agüero in 2017.

At international level, Yorke represented Trinidad and Tobago on 74 occasions between 1989 and 2009, scoring 19 goals. He helped his nation reach the semi-finals of the 2000 CONCACAF Gold Cup, and also helped Trinidad and Tobago to qualify for the FIFA World Cup for the first time in its history, later representing his national side in the final tournament in 2006.

Club career

Aston Villa
Yorke was first discovered by Graham Taylor, at the time the Aston Villa manager, on a tour of the West Indies in 1989. Yorke, aged 17, appeared in a team that played a friendly against Aston Villa, Taylor was impressed and offered Yorke a trial at Villa. Yorke was subsequently given a permanent contract and played for the Villa Reserve and Youth sides for the majority of the 1989–90 season, making his First Division debut for Aston Villa against Crystal Palace on 24 March 1990: Crystal Palace won the game 1–0. During his time with Aston Villa, from 1989 to 1998, Yorke played initially as a right winger until the 1995–96 season, he then switched to centre forward and quickly established himself as one of the Premier League's top strikers.

Yorke was an integral member of the Villa team that reached the League Cup Final in 1996. Villa won 3–0 against Leeds United with Yorke getting on the scoresheet. On 30 September 1996 he scored a hat-trick against Newcastle United in a 4–3 defeat. Newcastle were leading 3–1 at half-time and Aston Villa were down to ten men, with Mark Draper being sent off late in the first half. Yorke showed great character in leading his team in a brave fight back by scoring two more goals in the second half to complete his hat-trick, although it was to no avail as Aston Villa still lost the game. Yorke thought he had scored a fourth goal to equalise the game at 4–4, only for it to be ruled offside. It was performances like this that led to interest from Manchester United in August 1998. Yorke appeared for Aston Villa on 284 occasions, scoring 97 times. He also has the distinct honour of being the last Villa player to score in front of the old Holte End standing terrace, notching both goals in a 2–1 victory on the final day of the 1993–94 season, 7 May 1994.

The circumstances of his departure from Aston Villa were controversial. John Gregory, Aston Villa manager at that time, made it known that the club did not want to sell Yorke to Manchester United unless they were prepared to exchange striker Andy Cole. Yorke then approached Gregory to state that he wanted to leave the club, to which Gregory was later attributed as saying that he would have shot Yorke if he had had a gun in his office. Yorke played for Villa on the opening day of the season at Everton on 15 August 1998, however it appeared he made no effort during the match as he was unhappy at not being allowed to leave the club. Villa were left with no option but to sell the player and he was transferred to Manchester United for £12.6 million on 20 August 1998.

Manchester United
In his first season Yorke was a key player in guiding his club to a unique treble of the Premier League title, FA Cup and UEFA Champions League, and forming a legendary partnership with Andy Cole. Yorke finished the season as the top league goalscorer with 18 goals and contributed goals against Bayern Munich, Barcelona, Inter Milan, and Juventus in the Champions League, and he won the Premier League Player of the Season. Yorke was also a regular member of United's 1999–2000 title winning team, contributing 23 goals in all competitions.

Despite a less successful third season personally, Yorke scored his 100th Premier League goal in a 3-0 victory over Derby County on 24 November 2000 and also netted a hat-trick in the top of the table clash with Arsenal as United went on to win a third successive title. In January 2002 a move to Middlesbrough fell through. He played his last game for United that month, and was not issued a squad number for the 2002–03 season. Altogether he scored 65 goals for Manchester United in 152 appearances.

Blackburn Rovers
In July 2002, Yorke moved to Blackburn Rovers for an initial £2 million, potentially rising to £2.6 million; United had wanted a fee of £6 million. He was signed to cover the long absence of Matt Jansen from a traffic accident, and was reunited with his former United strike partner Andy Cole.

Yorke scored 13 goals in all competitions in his first season at Ewood Park, including the winner on 26 October 2002 as Rovers won 2–1 at reigning champions Arsenal. The following 4 January on his return to Villa Park, he scored twice in a 4–1 win in the FA Cup third round. On 11 May, in the last game of the season, he opened a 4–0 win at Tottenham Hotspur as Blackburn beat Everton to sixth place and UEFA Cup qualification.

Birmingham City
On 31 August 2004, transfer deadline day, Yorke moved to Birmingham City on a one-year deal with the option of a second. Instead of a loan to Celtic, he chose to join Birmingham for a "substantial but undisclosed fee". It was later reported as £250,000.

Yorke scored on his home debut for Birmingham in a 1–1 draw against Charlton Athletic, with the equaliser seven minutes after replacing Clinton Morrison. He scored again against Graeme Souness's Newcastle on 3 October. However, Yorke fell out of favour at St Andrew's and was released by mutual consent in April 2005.

Sydney FC

Yorke immediately signed for Sydney FC, with a salary of $1 million a season. He scored the first goal for Sydney FC in its first A-League regular season match, a diving header against the Melbourne Victory. Yorke came to Sydney FC with the biggest pedigree of all players in the A-League, having won the treble with Manchester United. Yorke scored 7 goals in the A-League, with three of them being from penalty kicks. Sydney FC coach Pierre Littbarski moved Yorke into a midfield role and gave him the team captaincy.

He played a major role in leading Sydney FC to victory in the inaugural A-League Grand Final on 5 March against regional rivals Central Coast Mariners. He set up the only goal, scored by Steve Corica, in front of a sell out crowd of over 41,000 at Aussie Stadium, and was awarded the Joe Marston Medal as best player in the grand final. Yorke was the marquee player for Sydney FC – meaning that his salary fell outside the salary cap. He was also a star name for the A-League as a whole. Aside from his footballing talents, the drawing power and credibility he brought both locally and internationally proved to be beneficial for the competition in its inaugural season, leading the Football Federation Australia to use his image and name for the promotion of the A-League's second season.

Due to the schedule of football in Australia, Yorke returned to Manchester United for training from March to June 2006, to retain fitness for the World Cup.

Yorke returned to Sydney FC to take part in a friendly against Everton in 2010. The game was considered his 'farewell game' as he never had the chance to say a proper farewell to the fans at Sydney FC. Everton won the match 1–0, and Yorke was substituted midway through the second half.

Sunderland

On 31 August 2006, Yorke's transfer to Sunderland was announced. The transfer for a fee of £200,000 (A$ $500,000) re-united Yorke with ex-teammate Roy Keane, manager of Sunderland. Yorke made his debut in the home match against Leicester City and received a rapturous standing ovation from home fans when he came on as a substitute in the first half. Yorke was used as a defensive midfielder rather than his usual striker role. He scored his first goal for Sunderland in the 2–1 loss against Stoke and was accepted by the people of Sunderland, switching on the city's Christmas lights in 2006.

On 2 January 2008, during Sunderland's 1–0 defeat to Blackburn, Yorke was given a red card by referee Rob Styles. Yorke stated several times he would like to return to the A-League, preferably Sydney FC. However, following Sydney FC's signings at the time it seemed unlikely that Sydney would have been able to fit him under the salary cap. It was reported that Yorke play for rivals Central Coast Mariners, the team bankrolled by the man who brought him to Sydney, Peter Turnbull.

On 11 March 2008, it was announced that the Mariners were in "advanced negotiations" with Yorke to become the marquee for two years. However, on 1 July he signed a new one-year contract to stay with Sunderland for the 2008–09 season. He was named man of the match for his performance against Arsenal on 4 October 2008, with Sunderland drawing 1–1 at home. Following Keane's departure in December 2008, Yorke and Neil Bailey were named as assistants to Ricky Sbragia. Yorke was released at the end of the 2008–09 season.

Post-retirement
Yorke has completed his Level B coaching badge, and in 2010 was quoted as being interested in pursuing a career in coaching, ideally with Aston Villa. On 17 April 2011 he completed the London Marathon in a time of 3 hours and 32 minutes. On 14 August 2011, Yorke signed a two-year deal to work for Sky Sports as a pundit.

International career 
Yorke was capped 72 times for the Trinidad and Tobago national team, scoring 19 goals. Along with his friend Russell Latapy, Yorke was a member of the 1989 'Strike Squad', the national team which narrowly failed to qualify for the 1990 FIFA World Cup. He retired from international football in 2001 after a disagreement with coach René Simões, who cut Yorke and Russell Latapy from the squad prior to a decisive game of the 2002 World Cup qualification, as both missed practice following a night partying. However he returned to the team for the 2006 World Cup qualification campaign, in which the team qualified for the World Cup finals for the first time in their history after a 2–1 aggregate qualifying victory over Bahrain.

Yorke was captain for all of Trinidad and Tobago's games at the 2006 World Cup and was man of the match in the 0–0 draw against Sweden, pipping his close friend Shaka Hislop to the honour despite the then West Ham goalkeeper making several world-class saves. He was one of six players in the Trinidad squad (the others being Brent Sancho, Dennis Lawrence, Chris Birchall, Carlos Edwards and Stern John) to have played every minute of the campaign. Yorke was rated the best defensive midfielder in the opening stages of the World Cup.

Yorke announced his retirement from international football in March 2007, choosing to focus on his club career at Sunderland. He captained the side in Germany, and up until his retirement. However, he made a guest return appearance for a friendly against England in June 2008 after being invited by FIFA vice-president Jack Warner. On 10 July 2008, the TTFF announced Yorke's return to the national team for the 2010 World Cup qualification campaign.

On 15 October 2008, he scored his first international goal after returning from retirement against the United States in a 2010 World Cup qualification match. The game ended 2–1 for Trinidad and Tobago. His goal was a crucial tie-breaker scored in the 79th minute, which put Trinidad and Tobago in a great situation to advance to the next qualifying stage, needing only a tie against Cuba in their final game. On 11 February 2009, Yorke scored a 26th-minute penalty for his country, but was sent off in the dying seconds of Trinidad and Tobago's opening match of 2010 World Cup qualification against El Salvador (2–2) after exchanging heated remarks with Mexican referee Marco Antonio Rodríguez (the Trini star had voiced his disapproval of the disruptions caused by the home crowd) and was consequently banned for four games due to his use of abusive language. The suspension was later reduced to two matches.

After being released from Sunderland and being unable to find a club before the end of the current transfer window, Yorke retired from football altogether in September 2009, and took up the post of assistant manager with the Trinidad and Tobago national team.

Management career

Early career
On 21 April 2019, Yorke was interviewed for the vacant role at National league side Sutton United, Sutton would appoint Matt Gray Instead.

On 12 November 2021, Aston Villa appointed Steven Gerrard as their new manager. Yorke said he was disappointed not to be hired instead.

On 21 April 2022 it was revealed that Yorke was being considered for the vacant manager's position at Perth Glory in the Australian A-League Men. Yorke responded to the speculation by stating "I don't want to be just handed the job on the back of my playing achievements. I want to earn the job the traditional Perth Glory way - by being hired as an assistant then taking over once the head coach gets sacked and the club has carried out a worldwide search."

On 25 May 2022, Yorke managed the A-Leagues All Stars in their 3–2 loss against FC Barcelona.

Macarthur FC
On 1 July 2022, Yorke became the new manager of A-League Men side Macarthur FC, replacing Ante Milicic to become the club’s second ever manager. Exactly three months later, he led the club towards its first ever trophy after winning the 2022 Australia Cup Final.

Yorke left the Bulls in January 2023, the day after a 1–0 loss to Adelaide United.

Personal life

Yorke grew up as a Tottenham Hotspur fan and his first jersey was a white Tottenham Hotspur shirt.

Yorke was once in a brief relationship with former model turned writer Katie Price; they have a son, Harvey, who was born in May 2002. He is autistic, partially blind and has the genetic disorder Prader–Willi syndrome. In a 2009 interview, Yorke conceded being unfaithful to Price during their relationship, and subsequently playing no role in the upbringing of their son. He has not claimed paternity.

The Dwight Yorke Stadium in Bacolet, Tobago, constructed for the 2001 FIFA U-17 World Championship, was named in Yorke's honour. Yorke is a cricket fan. One of Yorke's closest friends is Brian Lara. During the 1999 Cricket World Cup, Yorke made regular appearances bringing on drinks for the West Indies cricket team. Yorke's older brother, Clint Yorke, is a former first-class cricketer who has represented the Trinidad and Tobago national cricket team as an opening batsman.

Yorke featured extensively in an episode of Australia's The Biggest Loser, which aired on 28 February 2006. The episode involved Yorke coaching the "red team" of contestants while they competed against the "blue team" in a game of football. Mark Rudan, Yorke's Sydney FC teammate, was the manager of the "blue team".

As a member of the squad that competed at the 2006 World Cup, Yorke was awarded the Chaconia Medal (Gold Class), the second highest state decoration of Trinidad and Tobago. He was also made a Sports Ambassador for the country.

Yorke released his autobiography, Born to Score, in 2009.

In December 2018, Yorke avoided bankruptcy by paying a £1.5 million debt to HM Revenue and Customs.

Career statistics

Club

International

Scores and results list Trinidad and Tobago's goal tally first, score column indicates score after each Yorke goal.

Managerial statistics

Honours

Player
Aston Villa
Football League Cup: 1995–96

Manchester United
Premier League: 1998–99, 1999–2000, 2000–01
FA Cup: 1998–99
UEFA Champions League: 1998–99
Intercontinental Cup: 1999

Sydney FC
A-League: 2005–06

Sunderland
Football League Championship: 2006–07

Trinidad and Tobago
Caribbean Cup: 1989

Individual
Premier League Player of the Month: February 1996, January 1999, March 2000
PFA Team of the Year: 1998–99 Premier League
Premier League Player of the Season: 1998–99
Premier League Golden Boot: 1998–99
Joe Marston Medal: 2005–06
Sydney FC Hall of Fame: 2015
Chaconia Medal Gold Class: 2006

Manager
Macarthur FC
Australia Cup: 2022

References

External links

Dwight Yorke at Sydney FC
Dwight Yorke at Soca Warriors Online

1971 births
Living people
People from Tobago
Trinidad and Tobago footballers
Association football utility players
Association football midfielders
Association football forwards
Aston Villa F.C. players
Birmingham City F.C. players
Manchester United F.C. players
Blackburn Rovers F.C. players
Sydney FC players
Sunderland A.F.C. players
Sunderland A.F.C. non-playing staff
English Football League players
Premier League players
A-League Men players
Marquee players (A-League Men)
First Division/Premier League top scorers
UEFA Champions League winning players
UEFA Champions League top scorers
Trinidad and Tobago international footballers
1996 CONCACAF Gold Cup players
2000 CONCACAF Gold Cup players
2006 FIFA World Cup players
Trinidad and Tobago expatriate footballers
Trinidad and Tobago expatriate sportspeople in England
Trinidad and Tobago expatriate sportspeople in Australia
Expatriate footballers in England
Expatriate soccer players in Australia
Trinidad and Tobago emigrants to the United Kingdom
Recipients of the Chaconia Medal
FA Cup Final players